{{DISPLAYTITLE:List of Erigeron species}}
, Plants of the World Online (POWO) lists around 460 species of plants in the genus Erigeron (Asteraceae):

Plants of the World Online lists four named hybrids:Erigeron × corymbosus Erigeron × huelsenii Erigeron × pseudocrispus Erigeron × stanleyi''

References

Erigeron